Umayangana Thathsarani (born 21 December 2000) is a Sri Lankan rugby sevens player.

Biography 
Thathsarani captained Sri Lanka's U17 girls team at the Asian Qualifiers in Dubai, it was to qualify for the 2018 Youth Olympic Games in Buenos Aires. She represented Sri Lanka at the Asia Rugby U18 Girls’ Championship in Dubai in 2018.

In 2021, Thathsarani was named in Sri Lanka's squad for the 2021 Asia Rugby Women's Sevens.

Thathsarani competed for Sri Lanka at the 2022 Commonwealth Games in Birmingham where they finished in eighth place.

References 

Living people
2000 births
Female rugby sevens players
Sri Lanka international women's rugby sevens players
Rugby sevens players at the 2022 Commonwealth Games